Buckeye Fork is a stream in the U.S. state of Ohio. It is a tributary to the Muskingum River.

A variant name is "Buckeye Creek". The stream was named for the buckeye trees along its course.

See also
List of rivers of Ohio

References

Rivers of Muskingum County, Ohio
Rivers of Perry County, Ohio
Rivers of Ohio